The women's team foil was one of eight fencing events on the fencing at the 1988 Summer Olympics programme. It was the eighth appearance of the event. The competition was held from 27 to 28 September 1988. 60 fencers from 12 nations competed.

Rosters

Canada
 Marie-Huguette Cormier
 Madeleine Philion
 Jacynthe Poirier
 Shelley Steiner
 Thalie Tremblay

China
 Li Huahua
 Jujie Luan
 Sun Hongyun
 Xiao Aihua
 Zhu Qingyuan

France
 Brigitte Latrille-Gaudin
 Gisèle Meygret
 Laurence Modaine-Cessac
 Nathalie Pallet
 Isabelle Spennato

Great Britain
 Ann Brannon
 Linda Ann Martin
 Fiona McIntosh
 Linda Strachan
 Liz Thurley

Hungary
 Zsuzsa Némethné Jánosi
 Gertrúd Stefanek
 Zsuzsa Szőcs
 Katalin Tuschák
 Edit Kovács

Italy
 Dorina Vaccaroni
 Margherita Zalaffi
 Francesca Bortolozzi-Borella
 Lucia Traversa
 Annapia Gandolfi

Japan
 Nona Kiritani
 Keiko Mine
 Mieko Miyahara
 Akemi Morikawa
 Tomoko Oka

Poland
 Małgorzata Breś
 Agnieszka Dubrawska
 Jolanta Królikowska
 Hanna Prusakowska
 Anna Sobczak

South Korea
 Kim Jin-sun
 Sin Seong-Ja
 Tak Jeong-Im
 Yun Jeong-Suk
 Park Eun-Hui

Soviet Union
 Yelena Glikina
 Yelena Grishina
 Tatyana Sadovskaya
 Marina Soboleva
 Olga Voshchakina

United States
 Caitlin Bilodeaux
 Elaine Cheris
 Sharon Monplaisir
 Mary O'Neill
 Molly Sullivan

West Germany
 Anja Fichtel-Mauritz
 Zita-Eva Funkenhauser
 Christiane Weber
 Sabine Bau
 Annette Klug

Results

Round 1

Round 1 Pool A 

The United States and West Germany each defeated Great Britain, 9–6 and 9–3 respectively. The winners then faced off, with West Germany winning 9–1.

Round 1 Pool B 

South Korea and Hungary each defeated Canada, 9–3 and 8–6 (with an insurmountable 57–46 touches advantage) respectively. The winners then faced off, with Hungary winning 9–4.

Round 1 Pool C 

France and the Soviet Union each defeated Poland, 9–3 and 9–6 respectively. The winners then faced off, with the Soviet Union winning 9–4.

Round 1 Pool D 

China and Italy each defeated Japan, 9–5 and 9–0 respectively. The winners then faced off, with Italy winning 9–6.

Elimination rounds

References

Foil team
1988 in women's fencing
Fen